Woodhull may refer to:
 Woodhull, Illinois
 Woodhull, New York
 Woodhull Lake (New York)
 Woodhull Township, Michigan
 Woodhull, Wisconsin
 Woodhull Sexual Freedom Alliance, previously known as the Woodhull Freedom Foundation
 Woodhull Medical and Mental Health Center, Brooklyn, New York

People with the surname
 Abraham Woodhull (1750–1826), American spy during Revolutionary War
 Alfred Alexander Woodhull (1837–1921), US Army surgeon
 Caleb Smith Woodhull (1792–1866), Mayor of New York
 Jesse Woodhull (1735–1795), New York politician
 Maxwell Van Zandt Woodhull (1843–1921), American Union brevet brigadier general
 Nathaniel Woodhull (1722–1776), New York militia general
 Victoria Woodhull (1838–1927), American suffragette

See also
Woodall (disambiguation)
Woodell (disambiguation)
Woodhall (disambiguation)